The Welmel is a river of eastern Ethiopia. 

It is a tributary of the Ganale Dorya River, a tributary of the Jubba River.

Its headwaters are in the Ethiopian Highlands.

See also 
List of rivers of Ethiopia

References

Jubba River
Rivers of Ethiopia
Ethiopian Highlands